The commune of Kabarore is a commune of Kayanza Province in northern Burundi. The capital lies at Kabarore. In 2007, DGHER electrified three rural villages in the commune.

References

Communes of Burundi
Kayanza Province